Nagpuri literature refers to literature in the Nagpuri language, the language of Jharkhand, Chhattisgarh and Odisha. The earliest literature started in the nagpuri language when the Nagvanshi king and king of Ramgarh Raj started writing poetry in the 17th century. Since then, various literature has been written. Although in the present century, Nagpuri was never considered worthy of literary development. But some dedicated writers have engaged in writing short stories, plays and poetry.

History

Early modern period
According to findings of manuscripts, literary works in the Nagpuri language started in the reign of Nagvanshi and Ramgarh Raj. Only the identity of  King Raghunath Shah and King of Ramgarh, Dalel Singh, have established who were king in the 17th century.  They were writing poetry. These literature are in Devnagari and Kaithi script.

Late Modern period
Some poets of the late modern period were Hanuman Singh, Jaigovind Mishra, Barju Ram Pathak, Ghasi Ram Mahli, Das Mahli, Mahant Ghasi and Kanchan. There were also great writers like Pradumn Das and Rudra Singh. 

Hanuman Singh and Barju Ram Pathak were poets in 19th century. Hanuman Singh was 40 years older than Barjuram. Barju Ram Pathak was caretaker of Mahamaya temple of Hapamuni village in Gumla district which was constructed  by king Gajghat Rai in 9th century. His wife and children were killed by tribal insurgent in Kol rebellion between 1831 to 1833. They also demolished Mayamaya temple. The poetry of Hanuman Singh and Barjuram Pathak reflect Vaishnav and Shivaism tradition such as poetry on Lord Ram,  Krishna and Shiva. 

"Nagvanshavali" (1876), genology of Nagvanshis of Chotanagpur written by Beniram Mahta is a historical work in nagpuri. 

Ghasi Ram Mahli was a prominent poet who has written "Nagvanashavali", "Durgasaptasati", "Barahamasa", "Vivha Parichhan" etc.

Drugpal Deogharia wrote Nal Damayanti Charit, Mahaprabhu Basudev Charit. 
Mahlidas wrote Sudama Charit.
Jaigovind Mishra wrote Lanka Kand.
Jagnivas Narayan Tiwari wrote Ras Tarangini which is unpublished which contain 600 songs.
 Dhaniram Bakshi was singer and writer. He published his books as well as several other writers and helped in  preservation many works from going extinct.

The writing of prose in nagpuri language was started by Christian missionaries. Missionary Peter Shanti Naurangi was prominent among them.

E.H.Whitley wrote Notes on the Ganwari dialect of Lohardaga, Chhota Nagpur in 1896, which is considered the start of writing prose in nagpuri language.

Contemporary period
Some writer in contemporary period are Praful Kumar Rai, Sahani Upendra Pal Singh, Shiv Avtar Choudhary, Lal Ranvijay Nath Shahdeo, Bisheshwar Prasad Keshari, Girdhari Ram Gonjhu, Bhuneshwar Anuj and Shakuntala Mishra.

Baldev Prasad Sahu written Lav Kush Charit poetry.

Nagpuri taught in Ranchi University and other Universities of Jharkhand since 1980s. The study in regional and tribal languages in Ranchi University was started by Bishweswar Pradesh Keshri and Ram Dayal Munda during 1980s. Although Nagpuri was never considered worthy of literatary development, in present time a small but dedicated writers have engaged in  writing short stories, plays and poetry.

Author and work
There are around 645 known nagpuri poets and writers whose manuscripts and books have been available since the 17th century.
Works of some poets and writers in the nagpuri language are as follows:

References

Indian literature
Literature by language
Indian literature by language
Nagpuri language
Nagpuri culture